Uchenna "U.C." Iroegbu (born 20 August 1996) is an American-Nigerian professional basketball player, who last played for the College Park Skyhawks of the NBA G League. He played college basketball for Stony Brook.

Early life and high school career 

Iroegbu was born in Sacramento, California. He played all four seasons at Capital Christian High School. In his senior year, he averaged 15 points, 4 assists and 2 steals per game, being named to the all-district and all-league teams as his team finished third in the state of California with a 28–4 record and a CIF Sac-Joaquin Section Division V championship.

College career 
Iroegbu played his first two seasons for the College of Southern Idaho at the junior college level. He averaged 4.1 points per game as a freshman but got more playing time as a sophomore, as he averaged 6.6 points per game.

He transferred to Stony Brook before the 2016–17 season, joining a Seawolves team that had a 26–7 record the year prior to make their first NCAA Tournament. He started 10 of 32 games in his junior season and averaged 5.1 points. Iroegbu scored 18 points against Ball State as a senior, a new career high. On January 3, 2018, he hit a late three to give Stony Brook a 71–70 win over Maine after the Seawolves had blown a 20-point lead. Iroegbu recorded a new career-high 20 point game against UMBC on February 21, 2018. He finished his senior season averaging 8.1 points per game while starting 13 of 32 games.

Professional career 
Following a local tryout, Iroegbu started his career with the Stockton Kings in the NBA G League. On 9 January 2019, Iroegbu signed with CP La Roda in the Spanish LEB Plata to replace Jabs Newby. On 1 March 2020, Iroegbu signed with Rivers Hoopers in Nigeria for the 2020 BAL season. However, the season was cancelled due to the COVID-19 pandemic and Iroegbu did not join the team.

Iroegbu signed with the College Park Skyhawks of the NBA G League before the 2021–22 season.

Personal life 
Iroegbu's two brothers, Chuks and Ikenna, both played Division I college basketball as well. Chuks Iroegbu played for Northern Illinois and Ike Iroegbu was a starting point guard for Washington State.

References 

1996 births
Living people
American men's basketball players
Basketball players from California
College Park Skyhawks players
Nigerian men's basketball players
Point guards
Southern Idaho Golden Eagles men's basketball players
Stockton Kings players
Stony Brook Seawolves men's basketball players